Shariah TV is a Muslim-themed talk show, presented by Tazeen Ahmad, broadcast on a late-night slot on Channel 4.  The audience, made up of British Muslims, asks a panel questions relating to life as a Muslim in Britain.  Channel 4 frequently presents the panel as scholars in Islam, however many have not attained the necessary qualification to be termed a scholar and some themselves would refuse to accept such a title which carries great weight.

The series has continued to raise sensitive and diverse issues such as homosexuality, free speech, and anti-terrorism legislation.

The series returned on 5 June 2007 (at 00:10) for a four-part special from the city of Jerusalem.

The latest series began on 15 July 2008, and is broadcast from New York City.

See also 
Ajmal Masroor
Channel 4

External links 
Shariah TV Microsite at Channel4.com

2004 British television series debuts
2008 British television series endings
Channel 4 original programming
Television series about Islam
British television talk shows
English-language television shows
Islam in the United Kingdom